Neil Sleat is a newsreader and continuity announcer on BBC Radio 4.

Career
After joining the BBC as a trainee engineer, working as a studio manager and then an announcer/newsreader on the BBC World Service, he joined Radio 4 as an announcer/newsreader in 1998. He has also produced many BBC Radio 4 trails. He returned to BBC Radio 4 in May 2006 after several months away producing trails full-time. He left the BBC staff in 2021 but now does voice work on a freelance basis, including presenting on Radio 4 Extra.

External links
 BBC profile, with photo
 Studio Manager Course Photo
 Noted feat of pronunciation in a news broadcast

Radio and television announcers
BBC World Service people
BBC Radio 4
Living people
Year of birth missing (living people)